Jesús En El Centro: En Vivo is the first live album recorded in Spanish and performed by Israel & New Breed. The album Jesús En El Centro: En Vivo was re-recorded in Spanish from the album Jesus at the Center: Live and was released by Integrity and Columbia. Jesús En El Centro: En Vivo is the second album in Spanish by Israel & New Breed.  This album was recorded live at Lakewood Church in early April 21, 2013.

Track listing

NOTE:  These songs are Spanish-language translations of Israel & New Breed songs in English.  The original English-language song is listed next to each title.

Personnel
Adapted from AllMusic.

 Israel & New Breed – Primary Artist, vocals
 Israel Houghton – Composer, vocals
 Danilo Montero – Featured Artist, vocals
 Lucía Parker – Featured Artist, vocals
 Coalo Zamorano – Featured Artist, vocals
 Funky  – Featured Artist, vocals
 Meleasa Houghton – Composer
 Doug Enquist – Composer
 Joth Hunt – Composer
 Armante Lacey	– Composer
 Scharita Lacey – Composer
 Aaron Lindsey – Composer
 Micah Massey – Composer
 Sidney Mohede	– Composer
 BJ Putnam – Composer
 Adam Ranney – Composer
 Ricardo Sanchez – Composer
 Rene "M.C. T-Bone" Sotomayor – Composer
 Kelly Steele	– Composer
 Jeremiah Woods – Composer

Chart performance

References 

2013 live albums
Spanish-language live albums
Israel Houghton albums